The Double Six Monument is a memorial located at Sembulan area in Grace Garden housing complex in Kota Kinabalu, Sabah, Malaysia which marks the site of 6 June 1976 fatal plane crash known as the Double Six Tragedy bearing the first Chief Minister of Sabah, Tun Fuad Stephens, as well as six other State ministers.

Features 
The monument features the list of all victims in the crash, with all are the government officials of Sabah:

 Fuad Stephens – Chief Minister of Sabah
 Peter Mojuntin – State Minister for Local Government
 Chong Tain Vun – Minister of Communications and Public Works
 Salleh Sulong – State Finance Minister
 Darius Binion – State Assistant Minister for Chief Minister
 Wahid Andu – Permanent Secretary of the State Ministry of Finance
 Syed Hussein Wafa – Director of State Economic Planning Unit
 Ishak Atan – Private Secretary to Tengku Razaleigh Hamzah
 Corporal Mohd Said – Fuad Stephens bodyguard
 Captain Ghani Nathan – Pilot
 Johari Stephens – Fuad Stephens eldest son

References

External links 
 
 

Buildings and structures in Kota Kinabalu
Monuments and memorials in Sabah